CBVA may refer to:

 CBVA-FM, a radio rebroadcaster (98.1 FM) licensed to Escuminac, Quebec, Canada, rebroadcasting CBVE-FM
 CBVA-TV, a television retransmitter (channel 18) licensed to Escuminac, Quebec, Canada, retransmitting CBMT
 California Beach Volleyball Association, governing body for beach volleyball